The Book Room was an independent bookstore located on Barrington Street in downtown Halifax, Nova Scotia. Founded in 1839, at the time of its closing in March 2008, The Book Room was Canada’s oldest bookstore, and the largest non-chain bookstore in Eastern Canada. The shop acted as an important cultural centre for the local book community, offering support for local authors.

When announcing The Book Room’s imminent demise, its president, Charles Burchell, noted that the shop had "survived two World Wars, the Great Depression and economic ups and downs over its 169 year history", only to be shuttered by retail and economic shifts including online ordering and dual pricing schemes which render books more expensive in Canada than in the USA.

References

Defunct retail companies of Canada
Companies based in Halifax, Nova Scotia
Independent bookstores of Canada
Retail companies established in 1839
Retail companies disestablished in 2008
1839 establishments in Nova Scotia
Canadian companies disestablished in 2008